Janeth Christopher Pangamwene (born 27 November 2000) is a  Tanzanian professional footballer who plays as a midfielder for Mlandizi Queens and the Tanzania women's national team.

International career 
In 2019, Pangamwene earned a call up to the Tanzania women's under-20 team for the inaugural 2019 COSAFA U-20 Women's Championship. At the end of the competition they emerged champions after defeating Zambia by 2–1 in the final. She was subsequent promoted to the senior side and was named in the squad for 2020 COSAFA Women's Championship. The following year, she was named in the 2021 COSAFA Women's Championship squad list. She played four matches during the competition as Tanzania emerged champions for the first time in history.

Honours 

COSAFA U-20 Women's Championship: 2019
COSAFA Women's Championship: 2021

References

External links 

 
 

Living people
2000 births
Tanzanian women's footballers
Tanzania women's international footballers
Women's association football midfielders